Sir Ernest Musgrave Harvey, 1st Baronet, KBE, (1867–1955) was the Chief Cashier of the Bank of England from 1918 to 1925. Harvey was replaced as Chief Cashier by Cyril Patrick Mahon. He was Deputy Governor 1929 to 1936.

Honours
Harvey was appointed a Commander of the Order of the British Empire (CBE) in 1917, and was promoted to Knight Commander (KBE) in 1920. On 19 January 1933 he was created a Baronet of Threadneedle Street in the City of London.

See also
Harvey baronets

References

External links
http://www.anatpro.com/index_files/Ernest_Musgrave_Harvey.htm
http://artuk.org/discover/artworks/sir-ernest-musgrave-harvey-18671955-chief-cashier-of-the-bank-of-england-19181925-50250#

Chief Cashiers of the Bank of England
1867 births
1955 deaths
Knights Commander of the Order of the British Empire
Baronets in the Baronetage of the United Kingdom